Parallel Lives is a 1994 American made-for-television mystery-drama film written, directed and produced by Linda Yellen which returns some actors and similar patterns of Yellen's previous work, Chantilly Lace.

The film features an all-star cast: James Belushi, James Brolin, LeVar Burton, Lindsay Crouse, Jill Eikenberry, Ben Gazzara, Jack Klugman, Liza Minnelli, Dudley Moore, Gena Rowlands, Ally Sheedy, Helen Slater, Mira Sorvino, Paul Sorvino, Robert Wagner, Patricia Wettig, JoBeth Williams and Treat Williams.

Parallel Lives was broadcast August 14, 1994, on Showtime.

Plot
A college reunion turns into a tangled web of passion, romance and intrigue as old friends and enemies catch up with each other's lives.

Cast
James Belushi as Nick Dimas
Liza Minnelli as Stevie Merrill
James Brolin as Professor Spencer Jones
Helen Slater as Elsa Freedman
LeVar Burton as Dr. Franklin Carter
Jack Klugman as Senator Robert Ferguson
Patricia Wettig as Rebecca Ferguson Stone
Ben Gazzara as Charlie Duke
Mira Sorvino as Matty Derosa
Lindsay Crouse as Una Pace
JoBeth Williams as Winnie Winslow
Ally Sheedy as Louise
Paul Sorvino as Ed Starling
Matthew Perry as Willie Morrison
Jill Eikenberry as Lula Sparks
Treat Williams as Peter Barnum
Dudley Moore as Imaginary Friend / President Andrews
Gena Rowlands as Francie Pomerantz
Robert Wagner as the sheriff
Michael O'Rourke as Kirk O'Brien
Alan Feinstein as Dan Merrill

Production
The movie was developed by Yellen with the assistance of the Sundance Institute. As with Chantilly Lace, it uses "guided improvisations" with the actors, after receiving some general character outlines, free to improvise.

Parts of the film were shot in Salt Lake City, Utah, and California.

Reception
The movie received mixed reviews. New York Times critic John Leonard argued: "'Parallel Lives' is injured in its lightness of being by Yellen's added structure. But until it sinks in murky narrative waters, it's a marvel of raw edges and wild wit and surprise cunning, of craft that goes up like a kite to catch some lightning." The Variety critic Ray Loynd wrote: "When the movie works best (...), this is a movie that tends to make The Big Chill look sodden."

On the other hand, Lynne Heffley opened her review for the Los Angeles Times with these words: "From the sublime to the ridiculous... and the ridiculous has the edge in 'Parallel Lives.' Jerry Roberts in his Encyclopedia of Television Film Directors defined the film as "a cattle call at the actors unemployment line" and film critic Lewis Beale in his video review for the New York Daily News claimed that: "Linda Yellen's film wants to be hip, moving and Robert Altmanesque (overlapping dialogue and an improvisational feel), but it's simply tedious and stupid."

References

External links

1994 television films
1994 films
1990s mystery drama films
American mystery drama films
Showtime (TV network) films
Films directed by Linda Yellen
Films shot in Salt Lake City
Films shot in California
1994 drama films
American drama television films
1990s English-language films
1990s American films